Kehf el Baroud, sometimes mistakenly spelled Kelif el Boroud, is an archaeological site in Morocco. It is located to the south of Rabat, near Dar es Soltan.

Genetics

 examined the remains of 8 individuals buried at Kelif el Boroud c. 3780-3650 BC during the Neolithic. The 1 sample of Y-DNA extracted belonged to the paternal haplogroup T-M184, while the 6 samples of mtDNA extracted belonged to the maternal haplogroups X2b (two samples), K1a1b1  (two samples),  K1a4a1 and T2b3. The examined individuals were found to share genetic affinities with individuals buried at both the Early Neolithic sites of Ifri N'Amr Ou Moussa in Morocco and the Early Neolithic Cave of El Toro in Spain. They were modelled as being of about 50% Early European Farmer (EEF) ancestry and 50% local North African ancestry, suggesting substantial migration from Iberia into North Africa during the Neolithic. They had a lower amount of sub-Saharan African admixture than earlier North Africans buried at Ifri N'Amr Ou Moussa. They also carried alleles associated with light skin and light eye color. They were found to be closely related to the Guanches of the Canary Islands.

See also
Capsian culture
Iberomaurusian
Ifri N'Amr Ou Moussa
Kulubnarti
Luxmanda
Naqada
Cave of El Toro
Guanches
Taforalt

References

Sources

 

Archaeological sites in Morocco
4th-millennium BC establishments